Harald Parigger, born 1953 in Flensburg, is a German writer. He studied history and German in Würzburg. He became a secondary school teacher and later worked at the House of Bavarian History in Munich. He has written a number of academic essays, poems, plays, short stories and historical novels, mainly for children and young people. His novels include Im Schatten des schwarzen Todes (English- In the shadow of the black death), Der schwarze Mönch and Der Rubin des Königs.

References

External links 
 Official Homepage

1953 births
German children's writers
Living people
German male writers